Maranguape is a municipality in Ceará with a population of 130,346 (2020). The community was founded in 1851. It is part of the Fortaleza metropolitan area.

Notable people 
 Capistrano de Abreu - Brazilian historian.
 Chico Anysio - Brazilian comedian.
 Roberta Marques - Brazilian cineast.
 Lupe Gigliotti - Brazilian actress.

References

External links 
 Maranguape municipal site

Municipalities in Ceará